Milton Kerker (September 25, 1920 — May 2, 2016) was an American physical chemist and former professor at Department of Chemistry at Clarkson University. He is best known for his work on aerosol, interface and colloid science, as well as for pioneering surface-enhanced Raman spectroscopy. Kerker effect in optics is named after him.

Biography
Kerker was born on September 25, 1920, in Utica, New York. He received his A.B. in chemistry from Columbia University in 1941. From 1942 to 1945, he was a member of United States Army and received Bronze Star Medal for his service. He married his wife, Reva Stemerman, in 1946. Graduating from Columbia University with a PhD in chemistry in 1949, he joined Clarkson University as a professor in the same year. He acted as the chair of the Department of Chemistry from 1960 to 1964, as well as the Dean of Science from 1964 to 1966 and from 1981 to 1985. He retired from Clarkson University in 1991. Serving as the editor of Journal of Colloid and Interface Science from 1965 to 1992, he was also granted fellowships by Optical Society, American Chemical Society and Ford Foundation. Kerker died on May 2, 2016, in Thousand Oaks, California, U.S., and was survived by his wife and four children. He was a contributor to Midstream magazine and Jewish Theological Seminary of America, as well as Isis journal.

Kerker's work encompassed aerosol and colloid science, as well as their relation to light scattering by small particles. He is known for authoring the 1969 textbook on the subject, The Scattering of Light and Other Electromagnetic Radiation. Regarded as a pioneer of surface-enhanced Raman spectroscopy (SERS), he has worked on the mathematical models in the field. In 1986, Kerker also coauthored the article on light scattering by hypothetical magnetic spheres, which hypothesized a distinct absence of backscattering for small particles with equal relative permittivities and permeabilities. While being largely unnoticed at the time of its publication, the work has since attracted attention with the advent of metamaterials and nanophotonics; the associated phenomenon, named as Kerker effect, was later verified experimentally.

Selected publications
Books

Journal articles

References

External links
 The Scattering of Light and Other Electromagnetic Radiation

1920 births
2016 deaths
People from Utica, New York
20th-century American chemists
20th-century American non-fiction writers
21st-century American non-fiction writers
Columbia College (New York) alumni
Clarkson University faculty
American university and college faculty deans
American physical chemists
20th-century American physicists
Optical physicists
Fellows of Optica (society)
Jewish American physicists
Jewish American writers
Writers from Utica, New York
Scientists from New York (state)
United States Army personnel of World War II
20th-century American Jews
21st-century American Jews
Fellows of the American Chemical Society
Colloid chemists